Adrien-Henri de Jussieu (23 December 1797 – 29 June 1853) was a French botanist.

Born in Paris as the son of botanist Antoine Laurent de Jussieu, he received the degree of Doctor of Medicine in 1824 with a treatise of the plant family Euphorbiaceae.  When his father retired in 1826, he succeeded him at the Jardin des Plantes; in 1845 he became professor of organography of plants. He was also president of the French Academy of Sciences. De Jussieu was elected a Foreign Honorary Member of the American Academy of Arts and Sciences in 1850.

His main publications were the Cours élémentaire de botanique (Paris) and the Géographie botanique (Paris, 1846), as well as several monographs, most notably the one on the family Malpighiaceae. In botanical references he is usually abbreviated as Adr. Juss., also sometimes as A. Juss., as his father already has the abbreviation Juss.

The asteroid 9470 Jussieu was named in honor of the de Jussieu family.

In 1825 the French botanist Charles Gaudichaud-Beaupré published Adriana, a genus of Australian shrubs in the family Euphorbiaceae named in honour of Jussieu.

Notes

References

 
 
 
 

1797 births
1853 deaths
Botanists with author abbreviations
Fellows of the American Academy of Arts and Sciences
19th-century French botanists
Officers of the French Academy of Sciences
Scientists from Paris